The following list of countries by intentional death rate has been obtained by adding the suicide rate from the World Health Organization and homicide rate from the UNODC United Nations Office on Drugs and Crime (UNODC) Study. Intentional deaths include homicide (intentional injury death of another) and suicide (intentional injury death of self).

Based upon various metrics alongside calculations over the course of multiple years, Singapore has the lowest intentional death rate in the world, with Honduras being the highest.

Definition

Intentional homicide is defined by the United Nations Office on Drugs and Crime (UNODC) in its Global Study on Homicide report thus:

Though some discrepancies exist in how specific categories of intentional killings are classified, the definitions used by countries to record data are generally close to the UNODC definition, making the homicide rates highly comparable at the international level. UNODC uses the homicide rate as a proxy for overall violence, as this type of crime is one of the most accurately reported and internationally comparable indicators.

Figures from the Global Study on Homicide are based on the UNODC Homicide Statistics dataset, which is derived from the criminal justice or public health systems of a variety of countries and territories. The homicide rates derived from criminal justice data (typically recorded by police authorities) and the public health system data (recorded when the cause of death is established) may diverge substantially for some countries. The two sources usually match in the Americas, Europe and Oceania, but there are large discrepancies for the three African countries reporting both sources. For the 70 countries in which neither source was made available, figures were derived from WHO statistical models.

Deaths resulting from an armed conflict between states are never included in the count. Killings caused by a non-international armed conflict may or may not be included, depending on the intensity of hostilities and whether it is classified as 'civil unrest' or a clash between organized armed groups.

List of countries by intentional death rate

See also
 List of countries by intentional homicide rate
 List of countries by suicide rate
 List of countries by life expectancy

References

External links
 Suicide rates by country, 1950-2011 published by the World Health Organization (WHO).
 OECD Murder Rates : open, downloadable historical murder rates
 International crude death rates: data, charts and maps - World Data Atlas

Lists of countries
Lists of countries by per capita values
Crime-related lists
Lists of countries by population-related issue
intentional